Alberto Tricarico (born 10 August 1927) is an Italian prelate of the Catholic Church who worked in the diplomatic service of the Holy See and in the Roman Curia.

Biography
Alberto Tricarico was born in Gallipoli, Italy, on 10 August 1927. He was ordained a priest on 6 January 1950.

To prepare for a diplomatic career he entered the Pontifical Ecclesiastical Academy in 1953.

On 28 February 1987, Pope John Paul II named him a titular archbishop, Apostolic Pro-Nuncio to Singapore, Apostolic Pro-Nuncio to Thailand, Apostolic Delegate to Laos, and Apostolic Delegate to Malaysia and Brunei. He received his episcopal consecration from Cardinal Agostino Casaroli on 27 April 1987.

On 22 December 1990, Pope John Paul appointed him Apostolic Delegate to Myanmar in addition to his other responsibilities.

On 26 July 1993, Pope John Paul assigned him to a position in the Secretariat of State.

He retired in 2002.

See also
 List of heads of the diplomatic missions of the Holy See

References

External links
Catholic Hierarchy: Archbishop Alberto Tricarico 

1927 births
Living people
Apostolic Nuncios to Singapore
Apostolic Nuncios to Thailand
Apostolic Nuncios to Laos
Apostolic Nuncios to Malaysia
Apostolic Nuncios to Myanmar
Officials of the Roman Curia
People from Apulia